Michael Anti may refer to:

 Michael Anti (journalist) (born 1975), Chinese journalist and political blogger
 Michael Anti (sport shooter) (born 1964), American sport shooter